The Oka Crisis, also known as the Kanehsatà:ke Resistance, was a land dispute between a group of Mohawk people and the town of Oka, Quebec, Canada, which began on July 11, 1990, and lasted 78 days until September 26, 1990, with two fatalities. The dispute was the first well-publicized violent conflict between First Nations and provincial governments in the late 20th century.

Historical background

Early settlement

Haudenosaunee (Iroquois) people, mainly members of the Mohawk nation (Kanien’kehà:ka), first settled in the Montreal area in the late 1660s, moving north from their homeland in the Hudson River valley. The several hundred people who migrated at the time went on to develop three distinct Mohawk communities in the region; Kahnawá:ke, Kanehsatà:ke and Ahkwesáhsne.

Around 1658, the Mohawk had displaced from the area the Wyandot people (or Hurons), with whom the Haudenosaunee (of which the Mohawk were a tribe) had long been in conflict. In the fall of 1666, hundreds of French soldiers, as well as Algonquin and Huron allies, attacked southward from Lake Champlain and devastated four Mohawk villages near Albany, then negotiated a peace between the Haudenosaunee and the French and their allies which lasted for the next 20 years. In 1673, the Jesuit mission at Saint-François-Xavier brought about forty Mohawks from the village of Kaghnuwage, on the Mohawk River, in present-day New York state. In 1680, the Jesuits were granted the seigneurie Sault-Saint-Louis, now named the village of Kahnawá:ke, with a current area of over 4000 hectares. Starting in the 1680s, there was a military conflict between the English allied to the Mohawks and the French allied with other indigenous tribes. In the early 1690s, the Mohawks were weakened through a prolonged and severe military effort by the French.

In 1676, the Society of the Priests of Saint Sulpice (Sulpician Fathers), a Roman Catholic order, then based in Paris, France, founded Montreal Island's first mission at the foot of Mount Royal to minister to the needs of Iroquois / Mohawk, Algonquin and Huron neophytes and to distance them from French settlers in Ville Marie. In 1696, the Sulpicians moved 

In 1721, the Sulpicians moved the  mission to two villages on  territory with the Algonquins and Nipissings being assigned the village to the east and the Mohawks being assigned the village to the west including territory known since the late 1880s as "The Pines" (formerly "sand dunes behind the village ... part of the Common Lands on which the Mohawks pastured their cattle") and the adjacent indigenous cemetery.  This meant the Indigenous inhabitants were forced to move once again. To cushion the blow, they were promised ownership of the land they would inhabit. The  was expanded through two grants, one in 1733, consisting of small pie-shaped segment with 2  of frontage to the east of initial concession land, and, in 1735, a larger segment representing about 40% of the seigneurie's total area. In all three grants the land was provided under the guarantee it would be used for the benefit of Indigenous residents.

Land dispute

Following the conquest of New France in 1760, the Act of Capitulation of Montreal guaranteed that all the "Indians" who had been allied to the French would be free to remain on the land they inhabited unless those lands were formally ceded to the Crown. This was restated by the Treaty of Paris and again in the Royal Proclmation of 1763. Hence, the Mohawk began advocating for the recognition of their land rights to British officials. Similar claims in Kahnawá:ke and Ahkwesáhsne were recognized, but the Kanehsatà:ke requests to be released from the rule of the Sulpicians and reporting of seminary officials to white settlers were ignored. When the Sulpicians aided the British in crushing the Patriot's War of 1837–38, the seminary's land title was confirmed. The Mohawk continued pursuing their right to the land, petitioning, and failing, to obtain the recognition of Lord Elgin's recognition of their claims in 1851. Eight years later, the Province of Canada extended the official title of the disputed land to the Sulpicians.

In 1868, one year after Confederation, the chief of the Oka Mohawk people, Joseph Onasakenrat, wrote a letter to the seminary claiming that its grant had included about  reserved for Mohawk use in trust of the seminary, and that the seminary had neglected this trust by granting themselves (the seminary) sole ownership rights. In 1869, Onasakenrat attacked the seminary with a small armed force after having given the missionaries eight days to hand over the land. Local authorities ended this stand-off with force. In 1936, the seminary sold the territory under protest by the local Mohawk community. At the time they still kept cattle on the common land. By 1956, the Mohawk were left to six remaining square kilometres from their original 165.

The project area bordered The Pines, as well as a Mohawk burial ground in use, at that time, for nearly a century. The Mohawk suit filed against the development did not succeed. Construction also began on a parking lot and golf greens adjacent to the Mohawk cemetery.

In 1977, the Kanehsatà:ke  band filed an official land claim with the federal Office of Native Claims regarding the land. The claim was accepted for filing and funds were provided for additional research of the claim. In 1986 the claim was rejected on the basis that it failed to meet key legal criteria.

In March 1989, the  announced plans to expand the golf course by an additional nine holes. As the Office of Native Claims had rejected the Mohawk claim on the land three years earlier, his office did not consult the Mohawk on the plans. No environmental or historic preservation review was undertaken. Protests by Mohawks and others, as well as concern from the Quebec Minister of the Environment, led to negotiations and a postponement of the project by the municipality in August pending a court ruling on the development's legality.

Lead-up to the crisis

On June 30, 1990, the court found in favour of the developers, and the mayor of Oka, Jean Ouellette, announced that the remainder of the Pines would be cleared to expand the golf course to eighteen holes and to construct 60 condominiums. Not all residents of Oka approved of the plans, but opponents found the mayor's office unwilling to discuss them.

On March 11, as a protest against the court decision to allow the golf course expansion to proceed, some members of the Mohawk community erected a barricade blocking access to the dirt side-road between Route 344 and "The Pines". A court injunction in late April ordering the dismantling of the barricade was ignored, as was a second order issued on June 29. Mayor Ouellette demanded compliance with the court order, but the land defenders refused.

On July 5, the Quebec minister of Public Security, Sam Elkas, said, regarding the land defenders at the Pines, that "they have until the 9th [of July], after that date it's going down." The next day, the Quebec Human Rights Commission alerted John Ciaccia and Tom Siddon, respectively the provincial and federal native affairs ministers, of the rapidly increasing threat of conflict near Oka and the need to establish an independent committee to review the historical Mohawk land claim. Ciaccia wrote a letter of support for the Mohawk, saying that "these people have seen their lands disappear without having been consulted or compensated, and that, in my opinion, is unfair and unjust, especially over a golf course." This did not sway the mayor.

Crisis

Police raid

At 5:15 a.m. on July 11, police officers arrived at the Mohawk barricade blocking the southern entrance to the Pines. Police cars and vans, as well as rental trucks parked in front of the barricade. Police officers took tactical positions from high vantage points in the trees or hid in ditches, semi-automatic weapons at the ready. Others walked to the barrier. At the same moment, another police contingent approached the northern barricade, referred to as “Sector Five”. In total, about a hundred officers, including a tactical intervention squad and riot police, surrounded the Mohawk warriors and their allies.

The previous day the mayor of Oka, Jean Ouellette, had asked the SQ to intervene with the Mohawk protest, citing alleged criminal activity at the barricade. While the protesters had expected town officials or municipal workers, they had been promised by an SQ officer that the police would not intervene in this civil injunction. While they were reportedly willing to be arrested in the defence of their land, they had hoped to avoid violence.

The Mohawk women present at the southern barricade purportedly took charge of the interactions with authorities as they recognized the protection of the land as their own duty. A dozen of them, arms stretched out to signify their being unarmed and having no violent intent, walked towards the police. Authorities said they would speak only to a designated leader, while the group of women said that they were all representing the interests of the group and no single leader existed. Tensions escalated as the authorities would not discuss matters with the Mohawk women. Eventually, the group compromised and asked a male protester to come forward and talk with the officers; which was in vain. The SQ deployed their Emergency Response Team (ERT), a police tactical unit, threw tear gas canisters and concussion grenades at the protesters in an attempt to force them to disperse.

The Kahnawá:ke Warrior Society was called in for reinforcements, and by 6:20 a.m. they were seizing Mercier Bridge and the highways which fed into it. They gained control of the two lanes of Highway 138, and then pushed back the thousands of cars to Châteauguay. Over the next three hours they created a no-man's land between two barricades while other contingents blocked Highways 132 and 207 as well as Old Châteauguay Road.

Around 7:30 a.m. a front-end loader (sometimes cited as a bulldozer) and helicopter arrived, and the police moved closer to the barricade. Trees were sawed down by the Mohawk and added to the barricade while additional police cars arrived. Members of the surrounding Mohawk communities joined those already present at the Pines as tear gas canisters were thrown at the southern barrier. Around 8:30 the front-end loader rammed the barricade. Then armed police officers moved into the Pines, and gunshots were fired from both sides. Then the police retreated, abandoning six cruisers and a bulldozer. Although an initial account reported that 31-year-old SQ Corporal Marcel Lemay had been shot in the face during the firefight, a later inquest determined that the bullet which killed him struck his "left side below the armpit, an area not covered by [his] bullet-proof vest". Despite a 1985 SQ directive mandating that all officer communications be recorded, no record of the events was provided to the court, which the coroner decried as "unacceptable" and "even comical".

Siege

Upon their return, SQ officers established a perimeter around the protesters both at Kahnawáːke and Kanehsatàːke, blocking all access routes with rows of police cars and sandbags, preventing supplies like food and medication to be delivered and blocking ambulances from intervening. Representatives from the Quebec Human Rights Commission were also prevented from entering. In turn, protesters fortified their barricades and erected new ones, but police forced their way in to arrest, search and interrogate. On July 12, at the request of the Quebec minister of Public Securit, the Canadian Army began sending plain clothes military officers, C-7 rifles, night-vision equipment, bulletproof vests and armoured vehicles.

Before the raid, there were approximately 30 armed Mohawk in and around the barricade; following the gun battle, this number grew to 60–70 and later grew to 600. The Mohawks seized six vehicles, including four police cars, and commandeered the front-end loader to crush the vehicles and use them to form a new barricade across Route 344.

The Mohawk established a network for communications among the Mohawk villages/reserves of Ahkwesáhsne, Kanehsatàːke  and Kahnawáːke, using hand-held radios, cellular phones, air raid sirens and fire hall bells, as well as local radio stations, and patrols. The local Mohawk were joined by Indigenous people from across Canada and the United States. People from Micmac communities, as well as a Buddhist monk and Filipina acupuncturist joined the protesters in the early weeks of the fight. Fifteen activist-students were sent from all over Canada by the Canadian Federation of Students to write a policy paper, but most of the students decided to stay on in aid to the Mohawk cause instead. Additionally, over a hundred Oneida people from New York, Wisconsin, and southern Ontario, as well as a Quebec Algonquin man, and several women from western Canada and Mexico all came to help. The Mohawk Warriors and protesters also received support from Indigenous populations across the country.

The Mercier Bridge was blockaded at the point where it passed through Mohawk territory, thereby sealing off a major access between the Island of Montreal and Montreal's densely populated South Shore suburbs. This frustrated commuters, which resulted in violent confrontations. At the peak of the crisis, the Mercier Bridge and routes 132, 138 and 207 were all blocked, creating substantial disruption to traffic.

Corporal Marcel Lemay's funeral was held on July 16, and was attended by around 2000 people, including police officers from across Canada and the SQ director. The Warrior flag was lowered to half-mast in the Pines. On July 17, the Red Cross was granted entrance by police to provide food relief, but this access was rescinded quickly, forcing residents to smuggle provisions in. The Mohawk coalition, speaking on behalf of the resistance, agreed on preconditions for negotiations: free access to food and advisors and the presence of independent international observers, which both the provincial and federal governments firmly opposed.

Anger grew among residents as the crisis dragged on. A group of Châteauguay residents started building an unauthorized, unplanned roadway circumventing the Kahnawáːke reserve. Long after the crisis, this unfinished roadway was eventually incorporated into Quebec Autoroute 30. Residents of Châteauguay assaulted a Mohawk women trying to buy groceries and tried to prevent her from leaving the store, from which she had to be escorted by police, and threw tomatoes at her and her children. They also burned multiple effigies of Mohawk warriors while chanting "" (savages).

By August 12, the crowd at Mercier Bridge had become a riot several thousand strong, destroying police vehicles and wounding officers. The SQ lost control of the situation, and the Royal Canadian Mounted Police (RCMP) were deployed. This resulted in 35 people, including ten constables, being hospitalized for their injuries. The heated context of the "failed" Meech Accords and earlier that summer, as well as the tensions between French and English speakers in the province complicated public sentiment vis-a-vis the Kanehsatàːke resistance. Radio host Gilles Proulx raised tensions with comments such as the Mohawks "couldn't even speak French", while Simon Bédard of CJPR called for "cleaning everything up" by killing "fifty, one hundred, one hundred and twenty-five" people, burying them and forgetting about it. These remarks inflamed tempers that had been running especially high from comments preceding this crisis, including those by Ricardo Lopez, the federal Member of Parliament for Châteauguay, who denigrated the Mohawk.

Intervention by the army

Nightly gatherings at the blockaded Mercier Bridge grew in size and violence, adding to the pressure put on SQ forces, leading the Quebec premier Robert Bourassa to announce that in accord with Section 275 of the National Defence Act, he was requesting official military support from the Canadian Army on August 27. The same day Mulroney appointed Quebec Chief Justice Alan B. Gold as special mediator to negotiate an agreement with the land defenders. On August 28, press conferences were held by military leadership to announce the upcoming intervention and by Mulroney to denounce the actions of the protesters. Lieutenant-General Kent Foster announced the upcoming use of three Leopard tanks and that Brigadier-General Armand Roy was given full autonomy to attack at will with the objective of obtaining "unconditional surrender" from the Warriors.

In response, families with children and elderly members attempt to flee Kahnawáːke, and were met at the barricades by a crowd throwing stones. Though the SQ had guaranteed safety for the evacuees, they did not attempt to stop the crowd from breaking windshields and windows. Several people were wounded and Mohawk elder Joe Armstrong, 71, was struck in the chest by a large rock, and suffered a fatal heart attack the following day. The following morning, army forces replace SQ officers surrounding Kahnawáːke and Kanehsatàːke.

General John de Chastelain, Chief of the Defence Staff, placed Quebec-based troops in support of the provincial authorities; 2,500 regular and reserve troops from 34 and 35 Canadian Brigade Groups and 5 Canadian Mechanized Brigade Group were put on notice. On August 20, a company of the Royal 22e Régiment, known colloquially in English as the "Van Doos", led by Major Alain Tremblay, took over three barricades and arrived at the final blockade leading to the disputed area. There, they reduced the stretch of no man's land, originally implemented by the SQ before the barricade at the Pines, from 1.5 kilometres to 5 metres. Additional troops and mechanized equipment mobilized at staging areas around Montreal, while reconnaissance aircraft flew air photo missions over Mohawk territory to gather intelligence. On August 29, the Mohawks at the Mercier Bridge negotiated an end to their protest blockade with Lieutenant-Colonel Robin Gagnon, the "Van Doos" commander who had been responsible for the south shore of the St. Lawrence River during the crisis.

While the Warriors at Kahnawáːke had reached an agreement with government officials and had begun dismantling their barricades, Kanehsatàːke was now more vulnerable and isolated. Though the land dispute which had led to the crisis was resolved in principle, since the federal government had secured the purchase of the land from the developers and the town of Oka, it had yet to transfer the land title into Mohawk hands. Furthermore, the protesters at Kanehsatàːke were still waiting on safety guarantees for themselves and their allies before risking giving up their last bargaining chips. Nonetheless, Bourassa announced that negotiations were over and demanded that international observers leave. They reluctantly submitted to his request, and were replaced by local church and human rights observers. Multiple parallel and sometimes secret talks were held, unbeknownst to many of the parties involved. With the bridge no longer occupied and Kahnawáːke essentially neutralized, the armed forces entered Kanehsatàːke on September 1. They dismantled the last barricade on Highway 344 on September 2. The next day, only 24 Warriors were left defending a territory of only a few hundred meters and were surrounded by ravines, the lake, over 400 soldiers with machine guns, armoured vehicles and helicopters. They were sheltered in a treament centre, at the top of a hill, with dormitories, a kitchen, food reserves, and communication equipment. What followed was the last leg of a prolonged siege.

By September 6, the Mercier Bridge was functional again. Journalists were forbidden from approaching the Warrior stronghold and the army cut all cellphone service to the treatment centre. Anyone who left the compound was arrested, including legal counsel Stanley Cohen.

Resolution and aftermath
September 25 witnessed the final engagement of the crisis: a Mohawk warrior walked around the perimeter of the blockade area with a long stick, setting off flares that had been originally installed by the Canadian Forces to alert them to individuals fleeing the area. The soldiers turned a water hose on this man, but it lacked enough pressure to disperse the crowd surrounding him. This crowd taunted the soldiers and began throwing water balloons at them, but the incident did not escalate further.

Finally, after 78 days of fighting and 26 days of siege without supplies being let through, the land defenders decided to end the struggle. The remaining protesters began walking home, but all were arrested either while leaving Kanehsatà:ke or while entering Oka. As the military began arresting land defenders and some began to flee, 14-year-old Waneek Horn-Miller was stabbed near the heart by a Canadian bayonet, and nearly died. The journalists who had managed to stay with the Mohawk people in the treatment center were now held and interrogated. The Kanehsatà:ke Resistance was over.

Among those charged and convicted for their participation was Ronaldo Casalpro (who used the alias Ronald "Lasagna" Cross during the conflict). Casalpro was beaten by Sûreté du Québec officers after his arrest, and while three were suspended without pay, the case took so long to process that they had already left the force. Two SQ officers were suspended and investigated for allegedly beating Casalpro while in captivity, but were not subsequently charged. Cross served a six-year sentence for assault and weapons charges related to his role in the crisis and died of a heart attack in November 1999. Casalpro's brother, Tracy Cross, later served as the best man at the wedding of slain SQ Corporal Lemay's sister, Francine, who had reconciled with the community after reading At the Woods' Edge, a history of Kanehsatà:ke.

The golf course expansion that had originally triggered the crisis was cancelled and the land under dispute was purchased from the developers by the Government of Canada for  million. The municipality initially refused to sell the land until Mohawk barricades were dismantled, but acquiesced when the government threatened to expropriate the land without compensation. The Government of Canada did not transfer this land to Kanehsatà:ke ownership nor establish it as a land reserve.

The Oka Crisis motivated the development of a national First Nations Policing Policy to try to prevent future incidents, and brought Indigenous issues into the forefront in Canada. In 1991, Ouellette was re-elected mayor of Oka by acclamation. He later said of the crisis that his responsibilities as mayor required him to act as he did.

In media
The Oka Crisis was extensively documented and inspired numerous books and films.

Canadian filmmaker Alanis Obomsawin has made documentaries about the Oka Crisis, including Kanehsatake: 270 Years of Resistance (1993) and Rocks at Whiskey Trench (2000). These and two additional documentaries on the crisis were all produced by the National Film Board of Canada: Christine Welsh directed Keepers of the Fire (1994), which documents the role of Mohawk women during the crisis, and Alec MacLeod created Acts of Defiance (1993).

Montreal Gazette journalist Albert Nerenberg switched careers after smuggling a video camera behind the barricades and making his first documentary, called Okanada.

Gerald R. Alfred, a Kahnawá:ke Mohawk who was part of the band council during the crisis, and who later became a professor of political science, wrote Heeding the Voices of Our Ancestors: Kahnawake Mohawk Politics and the Rise of Native Nationalism (1995). This was based on his PhD dissertation, which examined the issues.

John Ciaccia, the Minister of Native Affairs for Quebec at the time, wrote a book about the events related to the Oka Crisis. His book, titled The Oka Crisis, A Mirror of the Soul, was published in 2000. Harry Swain, then the federal deputy minister of Indian Affairs and Northern Development, wrote "Oka: a Political Crisis and its Legacy," in 2010.

Robin Philpot wrote a book about English Canada's use of the crisis as a political tool following the failed Meech Lake Accord:  (1991).

Anarchist author and activist Peter Gelderloos said that the Oka Crisis should serve as a model for activists to get what they want for four reasons.
"It succeeded in seizing space.
It spread ideas of indigenous sovereignty and inspired many others in North America to fight back.
It did not have elite support.
The golf course expansion on their lands was defeated, and the conflict came to a dignified conclusion for the Mohawk."

The 2020 film Beans, which won the Canadian Screen Award for Best Motion Picture, portrays the incident through the eyes of a young Mohawk girl. Tracey Deer, who lived through the crisis when she was twelve years old, directed and co-wrote the film.

In art

Joseph Tehawehron David, a Mohawk artist who became known for his role as a warrior during the Oka Crisis in 1990, developed a body of artistic work that was deeply influenced by his experience "behind the wire" in 1990.

In popular culture

In the 1999 film The Insider, Al Pacino's character Lowell Bergman says "Everybody thinks Canadian Mounties ride horses and rescue ladies from rapids. Mike, they backed locals in Oka in a fight with Mohawks over building a golf course on their burial site, they beat up protestors at Kanesatake".

The Canadian punk rock band Propagandhi wrote a song titled "Oka Everywhere", which was released in 1995 on a 10-inch split album with I Spy. It was later re-released on their 1998 compilation album Where Quantity Is Job Number 1.

The Canadian indigenous hip hop duo Snotty Nose Rez Kids reference the Oka Crisis in their song "Cops With Guns Are The Worst!!!".

See also

Face to Face (photograph)
Timeline of Quebec history
Gustafsen Lake Standoff
Ipperwash Crisis
Grand River land dispute
Seton Portage#Land claims issues
Burnt Church Crisis
2020 Canadian pipeline and railway protests
Fairy Creek old-growth logging protests

Notes & references

Footnoted citations

References

Canada Govt, 

 

 IMDb

 
 

. Note: Prepared under contract for the Treaties and Historical Research Centre Comprehensive Claims Branch Department of Indian and Northern Affairs.

Further sources
A vast amount has been written in both English and French on the Oka crisis, including the following:

English works
 Taiaiake Alfred (1999). Peace, Power, Righteousness: An Indigenous Manifesto Don Mills: Oxford University Press
 Alan C. Cairns (2000). Citizens Plus: Aboriginal Peoples and the Canadian State, Vancouver: UBC Press;
 Canada, Parliament of; House of Commons (1991). Standing Committee on Aboriginal Affairs, The Summer of 1990: Fifth Report of the Standing Committee on Aboriginal Affairs, Ottawa; 
 John Ciaccia (2000). Oka Crisis: A Mirror of the Soul, Dorval, QC: Maren Publications; 
 Tom Flanagan (2000). First Nations? Second Thoughts, Montreal & Kingston: McGill-Queen's University Press;
 Donna Goodleaf (1995). Entering the War Zone: A Mohawk Perspective on Resisting Invasions, Penticton, BC: Theytus Books; 
 Rick Hornung (1991). One Nation Under the Gun: Inside the Mohawk Civil War, Toronto: Stoddart;
 Craig Maclaine (1990). This Land is Our Land: the Mohawk Revolt at Oka, Montreal: Optimum Publishing; 
 J.R. Miller (2004). Lethal Legacy: Current Native Controversies in Canada, Toronto: McCelland & Stewart Ltd.;
 Donald B. Smith (1982). "Onasakenrat, Joseph", in Dictionary of Canadian Biography, vol. 11, University of Toronto / Université Laval, 2003–, accessed November 16, 2021';

French works
 Gilles Boileau (1991). Oka, terre indienne, Histoire Québec, 5(2), 35–39; 
 John Ciaccia (2000). Crise d'Oka : miroir de notre âme, Montréal: Leméac;
 Francois Dallaire (1991). Oka : la hache de guerre, Sainte-Foy, Québec: Éditions de la Liberté;
 Jacques-A. Lamarche (1990). L'Eté de Mohawks : bilan des 78 jours, Montréal: Stanké;
 Robin Philpot (1991). Oka : dernier alibi du Canada anglais, Montréal: VLB;
 Hélène Sévigny (1993). Lasagne : l'homme derrière le masque, Saint-Lambert, PQ: Éditions Sedes.

Documentary films
 Acts of Defiance (1992). Montreal: National Film Board of Canada; 
 Rocks at Whiskey Trench (2000).  Montreal: National Film Board of Canada
 My name is Kahentiiosta (1995). Montreal : National Film Board;
Spudwrench: Kahnawake Man (c. 1997). Montreal : National Film Board of Canada;
The Oka Legacy (c. 2016). CBC/Sonia Bonspille Boileau.

External links
 
 Socialist Studies Special Issue: 20 Years After Oka
 The Mohawk Defense of Kanesetake
 Oka Timeline: An Unresolved Land Claim Hundreds of Years in the Making (CBC-TV, The Oka Legacy, 23Sep'17). 
 CBC Digital Archives – The Oka Crisis
 Historica – The Oka Crisis
 Various reviews of One Nation Under the Gun.
 LegalEase CKUT Radio Program podcast:  The Oka Crisis at 20 Years

1990 in Canada
Conflicts in Quebec
Indigenous conflicts in Canada
Indigenous rights in Canada
Mohawk tribe
History of Canada (1982–1992)
First Nations history in Quebec
Land rights movements
Protests in Canada
Aboriginal title in Canada
Mohawks of Kanesatake
Royal 22nd Regiment